The Defense Meteorological Satellite Program (DMSP) monitors meteorological, oceanographic, and solar-terrestrial physics for the United States Department of Defense. The program is managed by the United States Space Force with on-orbit operations provided by the National Oceanic and Atmospheric Administration (NOAA). The (originally classified) mission of the satellites was revealed in March 1973.

History 

During the 1960s, one of the most important projects that the United States civil space program was involved in dealt with meteorology and weather forecasting. Unbeknownst to many, the U.S. military services were also starting up a weather satellite program. This program, the DMSP, would relay important weather and climate data to the military for more effective operations. From the onset of the DMSP program, knowledge of its existence was limited to "need-to-know" personnel. The United States Congress had assigned a substantial budget towards the civil weather satellite program; if knowledge of a second military program came out, it would have been hard for the military to justify it.

Initial operations of early DMSP systems provided radio return of cloud-cover imagery for planning of U.S. high-resolution photographic reconnaissance and surveillance missions, which utilized film-return systems. DMSP satellites operated in a Sun-synchronous orbit; passing over the north and south poles, the satellite would see different strips of the Earth at the same local time each day. The DMSP satellites had periods of roughly 101.0 minutes, so they would orbit the Earth 14.3 times in 24 hours. This period combined with the Sun-synchronous orbit would have the satellite pass over the whole surface of the planet twice a day.

The images acquired were relayed to the Earth and received by two command and readout stations  established at retired Nike missile sites located near Fairchild Air Force Base in Washington State and Loring Air Force Base in Maine. From these sites, the images were then sent to Air Force Global Weather Central (AFGWC) located at Offutt Air Force Base, Nebraska. Images would then be processed, forming a mosaic representing the cloud patterns that were observed from the orbiting satellites. Meteorologists could then provide flight crews and other commanders with up-to-date observations for their particular missions. Further advancements enabled data to be collected in the visual spectrum down to a half-moonlit scene. Infrared processing enabled night viewing. Other enhancements increased on-board processing; this includes multiple on-board computers and expanded power requirements.

Now in its fifth decade of service, the DMSP program has proven itself to be a valuable tool in scheduling and protecting military operations on land, at sea, and in the air. In December 1972, DMSP data was declassified and made available to the civil scientific community. On 1 June 1998, the control and maintenance of the satellites were transferred to National Oceanic and Atmospheric Administration (NOAA) in order to reduce costs.

DMSP was to be replaced by the Defense Weather Satellite System (DWSS) but that was cancelled in 2012. In 2017, the Air Force awarded a contract to build the first of the new defense weather satellites, the Weather System Follow-on Microwave (WSF-M) satellite.

Losses of satellites

2004 explosion 
In 2004 the USAF weather satellite DMSP Block 5D-2 F-11 (S-12) or DMSP-11, launched in 1991 and retired in 1995, exploded in orbit with debris objects generated. It seems likely the fragmentation was due to either a battery explosion or to residual fuel in the attitude control system. Later, propulsion was identified as the "assessed cause" of DMSP-11 explosion.

2015 explosion and debris field 
On 3 February 2015, the 13th DMSP satellite — DMSP-F13 launched in 1995 — exploded while in a Sun-synchronous polar orbit leaving a debris field of at least 43 to 100 large fragments and more than 50,000 pieces smaller than 1 millimeter. The Joint Space Operations Center at Vandenberg Space Force Base, Lompoc, California is monitoring the expanding debris field, and "will issue conjunction warnings if necessary". The cause of the explosion was the rupturing of an onboard battery due to a design flaw (no collision with another object took place).

2016 failure of DMSP 19 without replacement 
On 11 February 2016, a power failure left both the command-and-control subsystem and its backup without the ability to reach the satellite's processor, according to the U.S. Air Force Space Command investigation released in July 2016 that also announced that DMSP 5D-3/F19 was considered to be 'lost'. The satellite's data can still be used, until it ceases pointing the sensors towards the Earth. The satellite was the most recent on-orbit, having been launched on 3 April 2014.

The failure only left F16, F17 and F18 – all significantly past their expected 3–5 year lifespan – operational. F19's planned replacement was not carried out because Congress ordered the destruction of the already constructed F20 probe to save money by not having to pay its storage costs. It is unlikely that a new DMSP satellite would be launched before 2023; by then the three remaining satellites should no longer be operational.

2016 explosion 
In October 2016, the 12th DMSP satellite - DMSP-F12 launched in 1994 - exploded in orbit. The satellite had similar battery as the one that exploded in the DMSP-13 satellite, thus raising suspicions that DMSP-12 explosion was also caused by battery problems. At the time the cause of DMSP-12's explosion was however unknown, although a collision with another object did not seem to be the cause. Apparently, very little debris (just one trackable piece) was generated in DMSP-12 explosion. DMSP-12 was decommissioned in 2008.

Near collision 
In January 2017, the Joint Space Operations Center announced that two non-maneuverable satellites would come dangerously close, with a collision probability as high as 44%. DMSP F15 and Meteor 1-26 were considered to be the prime candidates for the encounter. The operations center, which announced the possible collision, didn't identify the satellites involved but third party observers determined the most likely candidates. The two did not collide.

NOAA 16 and 17 
The NOAA-16 and NOAA-17 weather satellites were based on the same technology as DMSP satellites. NOAA-17 disintegrated in orbit on 10 March 2021. NOAA-16 broke up in November 2015.

Launch history 

DMSP was initially known as Program 35. The first successful launch of a Program 35 spacecraft used a Scout X-2 rocket lifting off from Point Arguello near Vandenberg Space Force Base on 23 August 1962. This was P35-2, the earlier P35-1 launch on 24 May 1962 had failed to reach orbit. All five Program 35 launch attempts using Scout launch vehicle, including the two successes, were made from Vandenberg SLC-5. Other early launches were conducted using Thor launch vehicles, with Altair or Burner II upper stages. Program 35 had by this time been renamed the Data Acquisition and Processing Program, and the DAPP acronym is sometimes used for these satellites. Eight satellites were launched using Atlas E launch vehicles between 1982 and 1995. Three were launched aboard Titan II vehicles between 1997 and 2003. One has been launched on a Delta IV rocket.

The most recent launch of a DMSP satellite, DMSP-F19, occurred on 3 April 2014, from Vandenberg aboard an Atlas V launch vehicle.

Block 1 
The DSAP-1 (Defense Satellite Application Program Block 1) satellites series, also known as P-35, was the first series of military meteorological satellites of the United States. The project designation P-698BH was used concurrently with P-35 from June 1962 and P-35 became P-417 in October 1962. The designation DMSP-1 (Defense Meteorological Satellite Program Block 1) was retroactively assigned to these satellites.

Block 2
The DSAP-2 (Defense Satellite Application Program Block 2) satellites series consisted of three modified DSAP-1 satellites, retaining the shape and dimension of the earlier series, featuring improved infrared radiometers. The designation DMSP-2 (Defense Meteorological Satellite Program Block 2) was retroactively assigned to these satellites.

Block 3
The single DSAP-3 (Defense Satellite Application Program Block 3) was a modified DSAP-2 satellite to provide experimental tactical access to weather data, for which a tactical readout station was built near Saigon. The designation DMSP-3 (Defense Meteorological Satellite Program Block 3) was retroactively assigned to this satellite.

Block 4A

Block 5A

Block 5B

Block 5C

Block 5D

   
In 2015, Congress voted to terminate the DMSP program and to scrap the DMSP 5D-3/F20 satellite, ordering the Air Force to move on to a next-generation system. The Air Force had intended to keep DMSP F20 in climate-controlled storage at a Lockheed Martin clean room in Sunnyvale, California, for a time in case it needed to be called up for launch in the coming years,  and in the aftermath of the failure of DMSP 5D-3/F19, the USAF was reconsidering the future of DMSP-5D3 F-20. However, in late 2016, the USAF began scrapping DMSP-5D3 F-20.

Photo gallery

See also

 NPOESS - the National Polar-orbiting Operational Environmental Satellite System
 Space debris

References

External links
R. Cargill Hall - A History of the Military Polar Orbiting Meteorological Satellite Program 
 National Geophysical Data Center archive of DMSP data
 Air Force Fact Sheet (dead-link)
 The High Ground - DMSP (dead-link)
 Air Force Research Lab Horizons magazine article
 Air Force news article
 SSIES ionospheric instrument data page 

Derelict satellites orbiting Earth
Meteorological Satellite Program
Weather satellites of the United States
Military satellites of the United States
Military space program of the United States
1962 in spaceflight
1963 in spaceflight
1973 in spaceflight
Spacecraft launched by Atlas rockets
Spacecraft launched by Delta IV rockets
Spacecraft launched by Titan rockets
Satellite series
Military equipment introduced in the 1960s
Spacecraft that broke apart in space